A pavilion is a genre of building often found at large international exhibitions such as a World's fair. It may be designed by a well-known architect or designer from the exhibiting country to showcase the latest technology of the exhibitor or be designed in what is considered the national architectural style of the exhibiting country. The German pavilion for the 1929 Barcelona International Exposition, for instance, was designed by noted modernist German architects Ludwig Mies van der Rohe and Lilly Reich.

See also
 Aberdeen Pavilion
 Bridge Pavilion
 Canada Pavilion, British Empire Exhibition
 Expo 2010 pavilions
 Moscow Pavilion
 Pavilion (generally)

References

External links 

Architectural terminology